Mary Sexton is a Canadian film and television producer, who is partner with Edward Riche in Rink Rat Productions and with Mary Walsh in 2M Innovative.

She is best known for her 2001 National Film Board documentary Tommy: A Family Portrait, about her brother, comedian Tommy Sexton. Co-directed with Sexton's husband, Nigel Markham, the film received the 2002 Gemini Award for Best History/Biography Documentary program.

Her credits also include the television series Dooley Gardens and Hatching, Matching and Dispatching, and the theatrical films Violet, How to Be Deadly and Maudie. She was also the regional producer in Atlantic Canada for Canadian Idol.

References

External links

Canadian documentary film producers
Canadian television producers
Canadian women television producers
People from St. John's, Newfoundland and Labrador
Living people
Canadian documentary film directors
Film directors from Newfoundland and Labrador
Canadian women film producers
Year of birth missing (living people)
Canadian women film directors
Canadian women documentary filmmakers
Film producers from Newfoundland and Labrador